Philip Corbet (1802, Ireland – 18 July 1877, Bitterne, Hampshire), was a 19th-century portrait painter who spent most of his working life in Shrewsbury, Shropshire, England.

Biography

Very little is known about Corbet's early life, although it is likely that he was born in County Tipperary, perhaps at his father's home in High Park, in the North of the county.

Philip's daughter Edith would later write that her father had been ‘intended for the Church‘ but that he was 'so passionately fond of painting that he at last induced his parents to allow him to follow the great mists of his heart, and become a painter’.

With this, he departed for London, and in 1821 enrolled in the school of the Royal Academy, which was at this time under the presidency of Thomas Lawrence. Henry Fuseli, J.M.W. Turner and Martin Archer Shee were all professors at this time, with the lattermost of these becoming a close acquaintance of Corbet, painting his portrait in 1823.

In 1822, he was living at the Charing Cross end of the Strand, at number 482, and would later reside on Everett Street, Russel Square, where Algernon Graves notes him as having still been in 1825. And yet, it is likely that by this time he had already settled in Shrewsbury, as his name appears in a list of members of the local Freemasons lodge in 1825. During his time in London, he had become a friend of the Salopian sculptor Thomas Carline, whose name appears beside his on both the R.A. enrollment records and the list of Freemasons. This friendship would have allowed Corbet immediate networking upon moving to Shrewsbury and may have been part of the motivation behind his decision to settle there. Amongst his earliest known paintings are portraits of each of Thomas' parents, whilst he would later paint their three sons and their daughter, and Corbet's future wife, Jane.

He very quickly managed to obtain commissions from much of the societal elites in the area, with Thomas Kenyon of Pradoe Hall, nr Oswestry, one notable patron during this early period of his career. Amongst others were portraits of Dr. William Clement, the Three Burton Brothers and a joint portrait of Hugh Owen and John Blakeway, whose History of Shrewsbury was hugely successful in the town at the time. All three of these paintings are held in the collection of Shrewsbury Museum and Art Gallery, and reflect his highly finished, refined, style. Similarities between his work and that of the seventeenth-century Dutch painters like Gerard ter Borch and Gerard Dou are clear during this period, with this personal interest of his later manifesting itself in his travelling to The Netherlands in 1829 or 1830, a trip he undertook with Thomas Carline. From this period, the Teylers Museum has several of his portraits in their collection, whilst he returned to Shrewsbury with copies of paintings by a number of Dutch Old Masters. Five of these copies that were later exhibited in Shrewsbury in an exhibition in 1958, when they were listed, with some slight titular alterations, as A Copy of Van Ostade’s Portrait of Paulus Potter, Lady in White Satin (after Gerard ter Borch), Dutch Interior (after Gerard Dou), Dutch Interior (after Pieter de Hooch) and Presentation of Christ in the Temple (after Rembrandt).

Upon returning from the Netherlands, he married Jane Carline, and his good friend Thomas became his brother-in-law. Jane and Philip would go on have ten children, which they raised in the Judge's Lodgings, in Shrewsbury's Belmont area, accommodation acquired with the help of his long-time patron Thomas Kenyon. He was able set up a studio in the attic here and proceeded to have a productive career as a portraitist until the 1850s. In the documentation concerning his eventual eviction from the property, it is suggested by Philip's son Rowland that his sight was failing him by this time and that he was unable to practise paintings in the manner he previously had. Within these letters, it is also suggested that he had looked to transition to a career as a daguerreotype portraits, perhaps in an attempt to combat his declining sight.

Following three portraits painted in 1856, no other paintings by Corbet are documented, but he would live for another 21 years.

By 1861, he had left Shrewsbury, census data noting him as a resident of St. Hellier on the island of Jersey, in which he is listed not as a painter but as a ‘Gentleman’ and a ‘Proprietor of Ireland’. By 1871, his occupation was noted as ‘Retired Painter’. Two of his children, Cyril and Rowland, had pursued careers in the Navy, so it is likely that he and Jane moved south to be closer to them. They later moved again to Bitterne, nr Southampton, where Philip died in 1877.

References

 The Henry Moore Foundation's Biographical Dictionary of Sculptors in Britain, 1660-1851 entry on the Carline family of sculptors

1802 births
Date of birth unknown
1877 deaths
19th-century English painters
English male painters
Artists from Shrewsbury
19th-century English male artists